Salem is an unincorporated community in Pike County, Arkansas.

References

Unincorporated communities in Pike County, Arkansas